Naria gangranosa is a species of sea snail, a cowry, a marine gastropod mollusk in the family Cypraeidae, the cowries.

Description

Distribution
This species occurs in the Red Sea and in the Indian Ocean along Kenya and Tanzania.

References

 Verdcourt, B. (1954). The cowries of the East African Coast (Kenya, Tanganyika, Zanzibar and Pemba). Journal of the East Africa Natural History Society 22(4) 96: 129–144, 17 pls.

Cypraeidae
Gastropods described in 1817